The northern beardless tyrannulet (Camptostoma imberbe) is a small passerine bird in the tyrant flycatcher family. It breeds from southeasternmost Arizona and Texas of the United States through Mexico and Central America to northwestern Costa Rica.

This species is found in light forests, cultivation and gardens with trees.  The domed nest is made of plant fibre or leaves with a side entrance. The nest is placed by a tree fork. The typical clutch is two white eggs, which are marked with rufous and lilac mostly at the larger end. Incubation by the female is 14–15 days to hatching, with another 17 days to fledging.

The head is dark brown with an erectile crest and pale supercilium. The upperparts are grey-green becoming paler on the rump. The wings are brown with yellow feather-edging and two whitish wing bars. The tail is brown, the throat grey, the breast yellowish, and the abdomen yellow. The bill is pinkish.

Sexes are similar, and this species always appears not as bright, especially with regard to the wing bars, as the closely related southern beardless tyrannulet, C. obsoletum, with which it was once considered conspecific. However, the two forms overlap without interbreeding in Costa Rica.

Northern beardless tyrannulets are active birds, feeding in a vireo or warbler-like fashion on insects, spiders and berries. The call is a loud whistled Fleeeeeerrr, sometimes broken up as a fleeer-it, or a flee-flee-flee-flee.   In courtship, or when alarmed, the crests are raised, the tail flicked, and an excited call is made.

References

External links
 Northern beardless tyrannulet Images http://tsuru-bird.net/image.htm Copyright 2009 Monte M. Taylor

Camptostoma
Birds of Central America
Birds of Costa Rica
Birds of Mexico
Native birds of the Southwestern United States
Birds of the Rio Grande valleys
Birds described in 1857
Taxa named by Philip Sclater